Unity Day was an annual celebration held in Philadelphia, Pennsylvania, previously along the Benjamin Franklin Parkway. The event promoted unity among family as well as peace among people of all walks of life. Unity Day events and activities focused on family values and multiculturalism. The event provided positive entertainment and information for all ages.

Event
The event was previously sponsored by Philadelphia's WDAS-FM radio station, Southwest Airlines, Chrysler, the Pennsylvania Lottery, VH1 Soul, Western Union, and 20 other companies that provided food, vendors, art exhibitions, literary workshops, a softball game, children's activities, and free music performances.

The 29th annual event was held on August 19, 2007.  The 30th annual event, billed as Unity Weekend, was held August 23-24, 2008, at Penn's Landing.

In 2009, The last Unity Day was held August 23, returning to the Ben Franklin Parkway.  It was also no longer affiliated with WDAS-FM, after Clear Channel Communications discontinued the event.

Footnotes

See also

Greek Picnic

External links
Unity Day 2007
Unity Weekend 2008

August events
Culture of Philadelphia
Philadelphia
Tourist attractions in Philadelphia
African-American events